Archamia bleekeri, also known as  Gon's cardinalfish, is a species of fish in the family Apogonidae, the cardinalfishes. It is native to the coastal waters of the Indian Ocean and the western Pacific Ocean from Africa to Indonesia and from Taiwan to Queensland, Australia. This species occurs in mangrove forests and reefs, and is an inhabitant of shipwrecks, preferring silty areas with muddy or sandy substrates. This species is the only member of its genus. The other species were moved to the new genus Taeniamia in 2013.

References

Apogoninae
Fish described in 1859
Monotypic marine fish genera
Taxa named by Theodore Gill